Sargasso is a London-based record label and live events promotion company founded by Daniel Biro.

It was established 1993 and integrated into Esfor Limited in 2008. It specialises in mostly avant garde, innovative and contemporary experimental music.

List of artists

Alienstalk
Joseph Anderson
Basil Athanasiadis
Paul Barker
Birmingham ElectroAcoustic Sound Theatre
Daniel Biro
Lawrence Casserley
Jane Chapman
Violeta Dinescu
Michael Edwards
Simon Emmerson
Evelyn Ficarra
Ambrose Field
Vinko Globokar
Anna Harvey
Jonathan Harvey
Erdem Helvacıoğlu 
Hyperyak
L'Orange
John McGuire
John 'Noise' Manis
Kaffe Matthews
Philip Mead
Eduardo Reck Miranda
Gilbert Nouno
Felipe Otondo
John Palmer
Rob Palmer
Sirin Pancaroglu
Gwyn Pritchard
Siren Circus
Songs from a Random House
Adam Stansbie
Markus Stockhausen
Adam Summerhayes
Daniel Teruggi
Marco Trevisani
Karmella Tsepkolenko
Frances-Marie Uitti
Mike Willox

References

External links
 Official site
 Parent Company site

Record labels established in 1993
Record labels based in London